Patrick K. "Pat" Neal (born March 4, 1949) is an American real estate developer and politician who is a former Florida State Senator and former representative in the Florida House of Representatives.

Early life and education
Neal was born in Des Moines, Iowa in 1949. He earned a bachelor of science (BS) in economics from the Wharton School of the University of Pennsylvania. In 1969, he enlisted in the U.S. Army Reserve, serving as an officer from 1972 to 1975.

He served in the Florida House of Representatives from 1974 through 1978 and in the Florida Senate from 1978 through 1986, where he was Chair of the Natural Resources Committee and the Senate Appropriations Committee. As a member of the Florida Senate, he represented Manatee, Hardee, DeSoto, Highlands, Okeechobee, and Glades counties.

During his time in office, Neal worked on policies focused on environmental protection. In 1983, he wrote Florida's first Comprehensive Wetland Act and Comprehensive Hazardous Waste Act to protect groundwater. He also co-sponsored the Estero Bay Aquatic Preserve Bill, recognizing the preserve as an outstanding water reserve and offering additional protection.

Neal is on the Board of Trustees for the American Enterprise Institute, a public policy organization based in Washington D.C. that researches government, politics, economics, and social welfare. He also currently serves as a member of the Investment Advisory Council of The Florida State Pension Fund, an organization providing oversight of decision-making and adherence to financial standards to funds.

Personal life
Pat Neal is the Chairman of the Executive Committee for Neal Communities based in Sarasota, Florida.

In 2005, he donated 120 acres of land to Manatee County, wanting to ensure the protection of its wetlands and other aspects. In 2014, this was opened as the Neal Preserve, featuring boardwalk trails and other recreational opportunities woven into the environment.

Neal is also a current member of the Board of Trustees and former Chairman for Florida TaxWatch, an independent, nonpartisan, nonprofit research institute in that aims to improve government efficiency and accountability.

References 

1949 births
Republican Party Florida state senators
Living people
Republican Party members of the Florida House of Representatives
Wharton School of the University of Pennsylvania alumni
Politicians from Des Moines, Iowa